The 2010 Fresno State Bulldogs football team represented California State University, Fresno in the 2010 NCAA Division I FBS football season. The Bulldogs, led by 14th-year head coach Pat Hill, were members of the Western Athletic Conference (WAC) and played their home games at Bulldog Stadium in Fresno, California. They finished the season 8–5, 5–3 in WAC play and were invited to the Humanitarian Bowl where they were defeated by Northern Illinois 17–40.

Personnel

Coaching Staff

Roster

Schedule

Game summaries

Cincinnati

at Utah State

at Ole Miss

Cal Poly

Hawaii

New Mexico State

at San José State

at Louisiana Tech

No. 21 Nevada

at No. 3 Boise State

Idaho

Illinois

vs. Northern Illinois (Humanitarian Bowl)

Awards

All-WAC
First Team Offense
OL Kenny Wiggins

First Team Defense
DL Chris Carter
DL Logan Harrell
LB Ben Jacobs

First Team Specialist
PK Kevin Goessling

Second Team Offense
WR Jamel Hamler
OL Bryce Harris

Second Team Defense
LB Travis Brown
DB Desia Dunn

Player of the Year
Defense
Chris Carter

NFL Draft
5th Round, 162nd Overall Pick by the Pittsburgh Steelers—Sr. LB Chris Carter

7th Round, 210th Overall Pick by the Atlanta Falcons—Sr. G Andrew Jackson

References

Fresno State
Fresno State Bulldogs football seasons
Fresno State Bulldogs football